James Henry Aloysius Ryan (15 September 1892 – 25 September 1915) was an English cricketer active from 1911 to 1914 who played for Northamptonshire (Northants).

Ryan was born in Roade, Northamptonshire. He appeared in nine first-class matches as a righthanded batsman who bowled right arm medium pace. He scored 119 runs with a highest score of 41 and took four wickets with a best performance of two for 51. Ryan played for Ireland in 1912.  He was killed in action at Loos, France, during the First World War, aged 23.

References

1892 births
1915 deaths
British military personnel killed in World War I
English cricketers
Northamptonshire cricketers
Ireland cricketers